The women's 57 kg competition in Taekwondo at the 2020 Summer Olympics was held on 25 July 2021, at the Makuhari Messe Hall A.

Results

Finals

Repechage

Pool A

Pool B

References

External links
Draw 

Women's 57 kg
Women's events at the 2020 Summer Olympics
2021 in women's taekwondo